Kazimierz Frelkiewicz (born 20 February 1940) is a Polish former basketball player. He competed in the men's tournament at the 1964 Summer Olympics, and the 1968 Summer Olympics.

References

External links
 

1940 births
Living people
Polish men's basketball players
1967 FIBA World Championship players
Olympic basketball players of Poland
Basketball players at the 1964 Summer Olympics
Basketball players at the 1968 Summer Olympics
People from Ostrów Wielkopolski County
Sportspeople from Greater Poland Voivodeship